Janet Ajzenstat (born 1936) is professor emeritus of political science at McMaster University. The author of numerous works on Canadian political history, she is best known for The Political Thought of Lord Durham, where she argues that Durham's call for French-Canadian assimilation was consistent with liberal principles.

Canadian federalism 
Her view of Canadian federalism, which dismisses the idea of special status for Quebec or Indigenous people, provoked much scholarly debate, especially following the collapse of the Meech Lake Accord. Ajzenstat also contends that judicial activism undercuts the foundation of responsible government; as a result, her work is well received by conservative scholars, such as Barry Cooper and Stephen Harper's former chief of staff Ian Brodie.

Education and family
Ajzenstat received her Doctor of Philosophy degree from the University of Toronto under the supervision of Peter H. Russell. While a doctoral student, she was a teaching assistant for Allan Bloom's introductory political philosophy course. She has described Bloom as a major influence on her own thought.

As an undergraduate at University College, University of Toronto, Ajzenstat majored in art and archeology. Following graduation in 1959, she worked at the Art Gallery of Ontario, only turning to political science in the mid-1960s. She is married to philosopher and fellow McMaster professor Samuel Ajzenstat. Their daughter, Oona Eisenstadt, is a professor of Jewish studies at Pomona College. Their son, Sandor Ajzenstat, is a Canadian artist specializing in what is known as Soundsculpture.

Awards
She is a recipient of the Queen Elizabeth II Golden Jubilee Medal (2002) and the Queen Elizabeth II Diamond Jubilee Medal (2012).

References

External links 
 

1936 births
20th-century Canadian non-fiction writers
20th-century Canadian women writers
21st-century Canadian non-fiction writers
21st-century Canadian women writers
Canadian political scientists
Canadian women academics
Living people
Academic staff of McMaster University
University of Toronto alumni
Women political scientists